"Moving On" is a song written by Fredrik Kempe and Sarah Dawn Finer, and performed by Sarah Dawn Finer at Melodifestivalen 2009, where it ended up 6th.

The song participated in the 4th semifinal in Malmö on 28 February 2009, dueling against Malena Ernman's song "La Voix" that reached the final. Sarah Dawn Finer's song reached "Andra chansen" in Norrköping on 7 March 2009. The song also became the choice of the international jury. At Andra chansen the song dueled against Scotts' "Jag tror på oss" and Lili & Susie's "Show Me Heaven", but managed to reach the finals together with Caroline af Ugglas's song "Snälla, snälla".

The song also charted at Svensktoppen, entering on 19 April 2009 where it stayed for 22 weeks. before leaving the chart in late September 2009.

Charts

Weekly charts

Year-end charts

References

2007 singles
Melodifestivalen songs of 2009
Sarah Dawn Finer songs
Songs written by Fredrik Kempe
English-language Swedish songs
2007 songs
Songs written by Sarah Dawn Finer